Political modernization (also spelled as political modernisation), refers to the process of development and evolution from a lower to a higher level, in which a country's constitutional system and political life moves from superstition of authority, autocracy and the rule of man to rationality, autonomy, democracy and the rule of law. It manifests itself in certain types of political change, like political integration, political differentiation, political secularisation, and so forth. The process of political modernisation has enhanced the capacity of a society's political system, i.e. the effectiveness and efficiency of its performance.

Sustainability studies researcher George Francis argues that 'political modernisation' is the changes in the nation-state brought about by the neoliberal globalisation process since the 1970s. It primarily consists of processes of differentiation of political structure and secularisation of political culture. 

According Samuel Huntington, an American political scientist, political modernization consists of three basic elements, the rationalization of authority, the differentiation of structure and the expansion of political participation.

References 

Politics
Political theories
Political terminology